Lithoglyphus pyramidatus is a species of freshwater snail with an operculum, an aquatic gastropod mollusk in the family Lithoglyphidae.

Distribution 
The distribution of Lithoglyphus pyramidatus includes:
 The Ukraine
 The northern Balkan Peninsula
 north-western Anatolia

The type locality for this species is Vrbas River near Banja Luka, Bosnia.

Description 
The shell has 4 whorls. The width of the shell is 7 mm. The height of the shell is 8.5 mm.

Ecology 
Lithoglyphus pyramidatus lives in rivers and in brooks.

References

Lithoglyphidae
Gastropods described in 1873